The Fulton Street station was an express station on the demolished IRT Third Avenue Line in Manhattan, New York City. The station was originally built in 1878 by the New York Elevated Railroad and had two tracks and one island platform. The next stop to the north was Franklin Square. The next stop to the south was Hanover Square. The station closed on December 22, 1950. The site of the former station is located in a playground across from the Titanic Memorial Park.

References

External links
 The 3rd Avenue Elevated
 Third Avenue Local

IRT Third Avenue Line stations
Railway stations in the United States opened in 1878
Railway stations closed in 1950
Former elevated and subway stations in Manhattan